Haris Zahirovic (born 11 May 2003) is a Bosnia and Herzegovina footballer who plays as a forward for Rapid Wien II.

Career statistics

Club

Notes

References

2003 births
Living people
Bosnia and Herzegovina footballers
Bosnia and Herzegovina youth international footballers
Association football forwards
2. Liga (Austria) players
First Vienna FC players
SK Rapid Wien players
Bosnia and Herzegovina expatriate footballers
Bosnia and Herzegovina expatriate sportspeople in Austria
Expatriate footballers in Austria